Sir Alan Walsh FAA FRS (19 December 1916 – 3 August 1998) was a British-Australian physicist, originator and developer of a method of chemical analysis called atomic absorption spectroscopy.

Biography
Walsh was born on 19 December 1916 and brought up in Hoddlesden, a small village about twenty miles from Manchester. He was the eldest son of Thomas Haworth Walsh, cotton mill manager, and Betsy Alice (née Robinson).

From the age of ten Walsh attended the local grammar school in the nearby town of Darwen, where he passed the Northern Universities Matriculation examination in 1933 and the Higher School Certificate examination in 1935. He then went to the University of Manchester to read physics. On graduation in 1938 he was also awarded a research scholarship, which he took up in the physics department, where he was particularly influenced by Henry Lipson’s suggestion that he work on the structure of β-carotene. Walsh spent on year at Manchester working on this, before moving to the physics section of the British Non-Ferrous Metals Research Association (BNF) in London, where he continued the theoretical work on the analysis. He was awarded an MSc (Tech) in 1944.

War began on the day Walsh joined BNF, and so he set the task of determining which metals were being used in enemy bombers that had been shot down, information that could help establish how the German war effort was advancing. He devised several methods for the rapid and accurate spectrographic analysis of alloys based on aluminium, copper or zinc. While developing the method he discovered that it could not always be transferred uniformly from one laboratory to another, so he set about devising a General Purpose Source Unit. This generated a stable and reproducible source of discharge, essential in spectrographic emission work. He then assisted Hilger & Watts Ltd to develop a commercial version.

In 1945 Alan applied for the post of Research Officer for Spectroscopic Investigations at the Council for Scientific and Industrial Research (CSIR) in Melbourne. After a long delay, he was offered the job in March 1946, but he first had to spend 3–4 months in Gordon Sutherland’s lab in Cambridge, to gain  experience in the new field of infrared molecular spectroscopy. This led to a paper on the structure of phthiocerane, the hydrocarbon derived from phthiocerol, found in tubercle bacilli.

Walsh arrived at CSIR, via laboratory visits in the USA, in April 1947. He set about installing the first  operating infrared spectrometer in Australia, a Perkin-Elmer Model 12B. He soon realised that its resolution was insufficient for any but the lightest molecules, so he devised and patented a double-pass system, which was licensed to Perkin-Elmer.

Walsh is probably best known for his development of atomic absorption spectroscopy as an analytical tool. This is a complex story, recounted in detail by Hannaford.

In late 1976 Walsh received a telex from the Royal Society telling him that he had been awarded a Royal Medal in recognition of “your distinguished contributions to emission and infrared spectroscopy and your origination of the atomic absorption method of quantitative analysis”.
He retired from CSIRO on 5 January 1977, and in June was created a Knight Bachelor. In 1982 he was invited back to CSIRO as a senior research fellow.

Honours, awards, affiliations and degrees

Medals and awards

Academic affiliations

Honorary degrees

The Australian Institute of Physics Alan Walsh Medal, awarded for significant contributions in physics by an Australian industrial physicist, is named in his honour.

Family

Soon after he emigrated to Australia Walsh met Sunderland-born nurse Audrey Dale Hutchinson, whom he married in 1949. They had two sons, Thomas Haworth and David Alan.

Alan Walsh died in Melbourne on 3 August 1998.

References

External links

The Alan Walsh Medal for Service to Industry

1916 births
1998 deaths
People from Darwen
People educated at Darwen Grammar School
British physicists
Australian physicists
CSIRO people
Fellows of the Royal Society
Royal Medal winners
Australian Knights Bachelor
Fellows of the Australian Academy of Science
Founding members of the World Cultural Council
British emigrants to Australia
Presidents of the Australian Institute of Physics
Members of the Royal Swedish Academy of Sciences